Graeme John Moore (born 28 January 1989, Johannesburg) is a South African swimmer. He competed for South Africa at the 2012 Summer Olympics, in the 100 m and 4 x 100 m freestyle. He is 6'6", 215 lbs.

References

1989 births
Living people
South African people of British descent
South African male swimmers
Swimmers at the 2012 Summer Olympics
Olympic swimmers of South Africa
Commonwealth Games medallists in swimming
Commonwealth Games bronze medallists for South Africa
People from Johannesburg
Swimmers at the 2010 Commonwealth Games
21st-century South African people
20th-century South African people
California Golden Bears men's swimmers
Medallists at the 2010 Commonwealth Games